Tom Frame may refer to:

 Tom Frame (bishop) (born 1962), Australian Anglican bishop and author
 Tom Frame (letterer) (1931–2006), British comics letterer